Eroeadae or Eroiadai was a deme in ancient Attica of the phyle of Hippothontis, sending one delegate to the Athenian Boule..

Its site is located near modern Chaidari.

References

Populated places in ancient Attica
Former populated places in Greece
Demoi